Harsh Vardhan Goenka (born 10 December 1957) is the current chairman of US$3.80 billion worth Indian RPG Group conglomerate. He is the eldest son of R. P. Goenka and chairman of RPG Group since 1988. He is listed as 77th richest Indian and number 1281 among world billionaire by Forbes. He graduated in economics from St Xavier’s College, Kolkata and thereafter pursued his MBA from the International Institute for Management Development, Switzerland. He has one younger brother Sanjiv Goenka with whom he amicably divided the business assets under advice from their father.

He has held positions as president of Indian Merchants' Chamber and member-executive committee at Federation of Indian Chambers of Commerce & Industry. He is a member of the board of governors of the National Institute of Industrial Engineering (NITIE), one of the leading technical educational institutes in India. He is also a member of foundation board of International Institute for Management Development, Switzerland, his alma mater.

Earlier, at an age of 28, he was specially appointed member of Estimates Committee for 1985–86 set up by Government of India, Ministry of Finance, Central Board Excise And Customs. In 2018, when Israeli Prime Minister Netanyahu visited Mumbai, he was one of the 10 corporate leaders of India who held power break-fast meet with him on bi-lateral trade with India in various sectors of industry.

References 

Living people
1957 births
Businesspeople from Kolkata
Indian industrialists
Rajasthani people
Businesspeople from Mumbai
St. Xavier's College, Kolkata alumni
RPG Group
International Institute for Management Development alumni
Goenka Family
Businesspeople in information technology
Businesspeople in agriculture
Businesspeople in coffee
Indian billionaires
Businesspeople in the pharmaceutical industry